The 2021 Forge FC season was the third season in the history of Forge FC. Forge were the defending league champions, having defeated HFX Wanderers FC in the 2020 Canadian Premier League Final. In addition to the domestic league, the club competed in the Canadian Championship and the CONCACAF League.

On November 2, Forge FC defeated Santos de Guápiles in the quarter-finals of the CONCACAF League to qualify for the 2022 edition of the CONCACAF Champions League, becoming the first Canadian Premier League club to do so. The club eventually bowed out of the competition in the semi-finals against Motagua.

On November 9, Forge defeated York United to clinch first place in the Canadian Premier League. This secured Forge the CPL Regular Season title, an honour that the league announced it will recognize retroactively.

Squad 
As of August 8, 2021

Transfers

In

Transferred in

Loans in

Draft picks 
Forge FC selected the following players in the 2021 CPL–U Sports Draft on January 29, 2021. Draft picks are not automatically signed to the team roster. Only those who are signed to a contract will be listed as transfers in.

Out

Competitions
Matches are listed in Hamilton local time: Eastern Daylight Time (UTC−4) until November 6, and Eastern Standard Time (UTC−5) otherwise.

Overview

Canadian Premier League

Table

Results by match

Matches

Playoff matches

CONCACAF League

Preliminary round

Round of 16

Quarter-finals

Semi-finals

Canadian Championship

Statistics

Squad and statistics 

|-

	

|-
|}

Top scorers

Clean sheets

Disciplinary record

Honours

Canadian Premier League Awards

CONCACAF League Awards

References

External links 
Official site

2021
2021 Canadian Premier League
Canadian soccer clubs 2021 season